The Vasyl Stus Prize, given since January 1989, is the first non-governmental prize awarded for "talent and courage" and being worthy of the memory of Vasyl Stus. This Prize was set up by the Ukrainian Association of the Independent Creative Intelligentsia and awarded every year on the poet’s, Stus', date of birth in Lviv.  In 1990 it moved to Kyiv.

Winners 

Among the winners (which is already over 60):

 Olena Golub
 Mykola Horbal
 Maria Burmaka
 Olga Bogomolets
 Igor Zhuk
 Opanas Zalyvakha
 Taras Kompanichenko
 Mykhailyna Kotsiubynska
 Ivanna Krypyakevych
 Volodymyr Kuchynsky
 Raisa Lysha
 Sergiy Moroz
 Kost Moskalets
 Vasyl Ovsienko
 Ivan Svitlichny
 Nadiya Svitlychna
 Liudmyla Semykina
 Halyna Sevruk
 Galyna Stefanova
 The Telnyuk Sisters
 Moysey Fishbein
 Valeriy Franchuk
 Oleksandr Riabokrys
 Myroslav Marynovych
 Iryna Zhylenko
 Yevgen Zakharov
 Lyubov Panchenko

See also

 Kobzar Literary Award
 List of literary awards
 List of poetry awards
 List of European art awards
 Shevchenko National Prize
 Warrior of Light

References and footnotes

Visual arts awards
Ukrainian literary awards
Ukrainian culture
Awards established in 1989
Ukrainian art